Raštak is a village in the municipality of Gazi Baba, North Macedonia.

Demographics
In statistics gathered by Vasil Kanchov in 1900, the village was inhabited by 270 Muslim Albanians and 230 Orthodox Bulgarians. 

According to the 2021 census, the village had a total of 457 inhabitants. Ethnic groups in the village include:

Macedonians 430
Persons for whom data are taken from administrative sources 17
Serbs 2
Others 8

Sports
The local football club is FK Raštak.

References

Villages in Gazi Baba Municipality